Paçanga böreği is a type of börek made with yufka filled with cheese, pastirma, tomato, parsley and pepper. Each material is chopped into thin or small pieces, and rolled in the dough as in sigara böreği, but larger. The pastries are fried and served hot.

See also 
Kol böreği
Çiğ börek

References 

Stuffed dishes
Turkish cuisine